Fritz Briel (24 October 1934 – 15 March 2017) was a German sprint canoeist, born in Düsseldorf, who competed in from the late 1950s to the late 1960s. He won a silver medal in the K-2 10000 m event at the 1956 Summer Olympics in Melbourne. Briel also won four medals at the ICF Canoe Sprint World Championships with three golds (K-1 1000 m: 1958, K-1 10000 m: 1963, K-1 4 x 500 m: 1958) and one bronze (K-1 10000 m: 1966).

References
 
 
 
 Fritz Briel's obituary 

1934 births
2017 deaths
Sportspeople from Düsseldorf
German male canoeists
Olympic canoeists of the United Team of Germany
Olympic silver medalists for the United Team of Germany
Olympic medalists in canoeing
Medalists at the 1956 Summer Olympics
Canoeists at the 1956 Summer Olympics
ICF Canoe Sprint World Championships medalists in kayak